Sandy Alcántara Montero (born September 7, 1995) is a Dominican professional baseball pitcher for the Miami Marlins of Major League Baseball (MLB). He signed with the St. Louis Cardinals as an international free agent in 2013, and made his MLB debut with them in 2017. In 2022, Alcántara unanimously won the National League Cy Young Award.

Early life
Alcántara was born in San Juan de la Maguana in the Dominican Republic. He is one of 11 children. When he was 11 years old, his parents sent him to live with an older sister in the capital, Santo Domingo, where he could both study for school and attend baseball practice. He dropped out of school in eighth grade to concentrate on a baseball career.

Career

St. Louis Cardinals
In July 2013, at age 17, Alcántara signed with the St. Louis Cardinals as an international free agent. He made his professional debut in 2014 with the Dominican Summer League Cardinals and spent the whole season there, going 1–9 with a 3.97 ERA in 12 games (11 starts). He spent 2015 with the Gulf Coast Cardinals where he pitched to a 4–4 record and 3.22 ERA in 12 games started, and started 2016 with the Peoria Chiefs. During a start in May he tied the Chiefs record with 14 strikeouts. He was promoted to the Palm Beach Cardinals in July 2016. He finished the 2016 season with a combined 5–11 record with a 3.96 ERA in 23 games started between both clubs. 

Alcántara began 2017 with the Springfield Cardinals. After pitching to a 7–5 record and 4.31 ERA while 4th in the league in walks and leading it with 20 wild pitches in a career high 125.1 innings, the Cardinals promoted him to the major leagues on September 1, 2017. After the season, the Cardinals assigned Alcántara to the Surprise Saguaros of the Arizona Fall League (AFL), where he was selected to the Fall Stars Game. He pitched 15 total innings in the AFL, finishing the season with five games started, a 1–2 record, and a 4.20 ERA.

Miami Marlins

On December 14, 2017, the Cardinals traded Alcántara, along with Magneuris Sierra, Zac Gallen, and Daniel Castano to the Miami Marlins for Marcell Ozuna. MLB.com ranked Alcántara as Miami's third-best prospect going into the 2018 season. He began 2018 with the New Orleans Baby Cakes, and was recalled by Miami on June 28. He made his Marlins debut on June 29 as the starting pitcher, pitching five innings in which he gave up one run on three hits and five walks while striking out two, earning the win as Miami defeated the New York Mets 8–2. He was placed on the 10-day disabled list on with a right axillary infection. On May 19, 2019, Alcántara pitched his first career shutout, an 89-pitch two-hit Maddux against the New York Mets.

Alcántara was the sole Miami Marlins player named to the 2019 Major League Baseball All-Star Game. Pitching the eighth inning, he retired the side. He finished the season with a 6–14 record and a 3.88 ERA over  innings in 32 starts, leading the National League in losses and shutouts.

In the shortened 2020 season, Alcántara was 3–2 with a 3.00 ERA in 42 innings.

Alcántara owns Marlins franchise records of most innings pitched by a rookie, and most innings pitched and strikeouts by a Dominican-born player. On November 28, 2021, the Marlins signed Alcántara to a contract extension worth $56 million, breaking the record for the largest contract for a pitcher under team control with less than four years service time set by Carlos Martinez.

In 2022, he was 14–9 with a 2.28 ERA in 32 starts covering 228.2 innings. With a bWAR of 8.0, Alcántara led the National League, and led all pitchers across both leagues. He unanimously won the 2022 NL Cy Young Award, over second-place pitcher Max Fried.

Pitching style
Alcántara's fastball velocity generally sits between 97 and 99 miles per hour, maxing out around 101 mph. He uses both a four-seam fastball and a sinker, which possess above-average vertical and horizontal movement. His secondary pitches are the changeup (90-94 mph average velocity), slider (89-93 mph) and curveball (82 mph), although his use of the curveball is scarce.

Philanthropy
In partnership with The Giving Much More (GMM) Foundation, and The Baseball Club. Alcántara hosted multiple fundraising events in 2019 to collect baseball equipment for underprivileged youth in his native Dominican Republic. This included the first annual "Softball with the Sandman" Charity Baseball Tournament on his 24th birthday.

After completing his 2019 season, Alcántara traveled to the Dominican Republic to deliver the equipment directly to the children.

References

External links

1995 births
Living people
Cy Young Award winners
Dominican Republic expatriate baseball players in the United States
Dominican Summer League Cardinals players
Gigantes del Cibao players
Gulf Coast Cardinals players
Major League Baseball players from the Dominican Republic
Major League Baseball pitchers
Miami Marlins players
National League All-Stars
New Orleans Baby Cakes players
Palm Beach Cardinals players
Peoria Chiefs players
Springfield Cardinals players
St. Louis Cardinals players
Surprise Saguaros players
2023 World Baseball Classic players